Tenasserim may refer to:

 Tenasserim Division, also known as the Tenasserim coast, or Tenasserim peninsula, former name of the Tanintharyi Region in Myanmar (Burma)
 Tenasserim town, a former name of Tanintharyi
 Tenasserim Hills or Tenasserim Range, part of the Indo-Malayan mountain system in Southeast Asia
 Tenasserim Island, an island in the Mergui Archipelago in Myanmar (Burma)
 Great Tenasserim River, a major river of southeastern Myanmar (Burma)
 Tenasserim white-bellied rat 
 Tenasserim lutung
 Tenasserim Mountain bent-toed gecko

See also 
 Tanintharyi (disambiguation)
 Burmese–Siamese War (1759–1760), a conflict for control of the Tenasserim region